Padre is a village in Manjeshwaram Taluk of Kasaragod district in Kerala, India.

Demographics
As of 2011 Census, Padre village had population of 5,092 which constitutes 2,586 males and 2,506 females. The male female sex ratio was 969 lower than state average of 1084. Population in the age group 0-6 was 417 (8.2%) where 215 are males and 202 are females. Padre had overall literacy of 84.6% lower than state average of 94%. Male literacy stands at 90.9% and Female literacy was 78%.

Administration
Padre village is part of Enmakaje Grama Panchayat. Politically it comes under Manjeshwar (State Assembly constituency) which is part of Kasaragod (Lok Sabha constituency).

References

Manjeshwar area
Villages in Kasaragod district